Guoyuan Township is a township of Lubei District, Tangshan, Hebei, People's Republic of China, extending into the western outskirts of the city. , it has 36 villages under its administration.

See also
List of township-level divisions of Hebei

References

Township-level divisions of Hebei